The Ness Islands Railway is a  gauge miniature railway in Inverness, Scotland, opened in 1983.

Overview
Operating around a site in Whin Park, near the Ness Islands, an area popular for recreation amongst tourists and the local population, the Ness Islands Railway markets itself as the most northerly public miniature railway in the United Kingdom. The Sanday Light Railway on the Island of Orkney is further north, but is no longer open to the public.

In the 1990s the Ness Islands Railway operated a fleet of replica diesel locomotives, representing in miniature assorted current locomotive designs of British Rail. The locomotive fleet has since been rationalised, with two diesel engines and one steam engine currently in operation:

 Uncle Frank – Class 91 diesel locomotive – 4w4wDH – Built 1991 (Mardyke)
 Uncle John – Class 47 diesel locomotive – 4w4wDH – Built 2011 (Mardyke)
 Chrissy – Tinkerbell Class steam locomotive – 0-4-2 – Built 2012 (Peter Beevers)

The railway features repeat loops, cuttings, and over-bridges, including a 140-foot iron bridge dating from 1837. It usually operates from Easter to October, running at weekends, with a daily service during school holidays.

Since April 2019 Ness Islands Railway has been owned and operated by Highland Hospice.  All surplus funds support the delivery of hospice services across the Highlands. 
In 2020 the bridge on the railway was vandalized and had to be fixed. Most of the money was provided by the public.

References

External links
 
 Ness Island Railway official website
 Highland Hospice official website

7¼ in gauge railways in Scotland
Railway lines opened in 1983
Heritage railways in Scotland
Transport in Inverness
1983 establishments in Scotland